The Otaniemi water tower is a structure designed by the well-known Finnish architect Alvar Aalto in 1971. The water tower is located in Otaniemi area, Espoo, Finland.  The total capacity of the tower is 6000 m³.   It rises to a height of 45 meters.  It is Otaniemi's principal landmark, and consists of two stacked elements - the water storage tank and a free-form, five-story building constructed underneath containing the technical spaces and offices.

References

Alvar Aalto buildings
Buildings and structures in Espoo
Water towers in Finland